Cape Kane is a headland in North Greenland. Administratively it belongs to the Northeast Greenland National Park.

Cape Kane was named after Arctic explorer Elisha Kent Kane (1820 – 1857) at the time that it was the nearest land to the North Pole that had been put on the map.

Geography
Hunt Fjord is under the influence of slow-moving glaciers discharging on both sides of Cape Kane that completely fill it and partially clog neighboring Conger Sound as well. 

Cape Kane is the westernmost point of the Roosevelt Land Peninsula. Cape Christiansen is the headland on the other side of Conger Sound, at the northern end of Lockwood Island.

See also
Peary Land

References

External links
 Explorers and Travellers Part 14

Headlands of Greenland
Peary Land